Chewsville is a census-designated place (CDP) in Washington County, Maryland, United States. The population was 293 at the 2000 census.

Geography
Chewsville is located at  (39.643149, −77.635032).

Demographics

2010

2000
At the 2000 census there were 293 people, 117 households, and 74 families living in the CDP. The racial makeup of the CDP was 98.98% White, 0.34% Asian, and 0.68% from two or more races.
Of the 117 households 29.9% had children under the age of 18 living with them, 51.3% were married couples living together, 7.7% had a female householder with no husband present, and 35.9% were non-families. 29.1% of households were one person and 9.4% were one person aged 65 or older. The average household size was 2.50 and the average family size was 3.15.

The age distribution was 29.0% under the age of 18, 6.5% from 18 to 24, 30.0% from 25 to 44, 22.5% from 45 to 64, and 11.9% 65 or older. The median age was 37 years. For every 100 females, there were 98.0 males. For every 100 females age 18 and over, there were 94.4 males.

The median household income was $28,482 and the median family income  was $31,302. Males had a median income of $26,250 versus $24,844 for females. The per capita income for the CDP was $12,617. About 22.7% of families and 22.7% of the population were below the poverty line, including 44.2% of those under the age of eighteen and 51.3% of those sixty five or over.

References

Census-designated places in Maryland
Census-designated places in Washington County, Maryland